Sarah Webber is the name of:

 Sarah Webber (General Hospital)
Sarah Webber, character in 31 North 62 East